Geri Hoo (1939 - Dec. 29, 2007) was an American actress and beauty pageant titleholder. Hoo was Miss Hawaii Universe 1958.

Early life 
In 1939, Hoo was born. Hoo's father was Herbert N. Hoo. Hoo's mother was Amy Kui Kiao Hoo (1920-2000), a realtor in Hawaii. Hoo's sibling are Sidney Hung, Vernon, Rick, Randy, and Sharon.

Career 
In 1958, Hoo represented Hawaii and ended up as the second runner up at the 7th Miss Universe contest.

Hoo had a minor part in the 1962 film Confessions of an Opium Eater.

Filmography

Television series 
 1959 The Millionaire - Miss Hawaii.

Films 
 1962 Confessions of an Opium Eater - 2nd Dancing girl.

Personal life 
In 1958, Hoo married Austin F. Phillips. They have four children. Hoo and her family lived in Los Angeles, California.

Hoo was also known as Geri DeWelles. Hoo was a resident of Costa Mesa, California. On December 29, 2007, Hoo died. Hoo was 68.

See also 
 List of Miss Universe runners-up and finalists

References

External links 

Jan. 2008 Honolulu Advisor obituary
 1958 Image of Geri Hoo as Miss Hawaii in Burbank, California

20th-century American actresses
American beauty pageant winners
American film actresses
Miss Universe 1958 contestants
1939 births
2007 deaths
21st-century American women